Martyn Charles John Ball (born 26 April 1970, in Bristol) is an English former cricketer. He was a right-handed batsman and right-arm off-break bowler. He spent his 19-year career at Gloucestershire.

Ball made his first-class debut in 1988 and continued to bowl a trademark floating off-break for several years, and in 1996 was offered his first county cap. Ball was at the forefront of Gloucestershire's rise to the top of the English game, in a county which at the time was producing few top-quality players.

Ball replaced Robert Croft when the latter revealed he was uncomfortable about going on the 2001-02 tour to India, but the selectors handed starts to Richard Dawson and Ashley Giles over Ball on tour.

Ball was involved with the Professional Cricketers' Association, initially as a player's representative before rising to the rank of chairman at the end of his career.

He retired in January 2007 and now works for an American real estate company.

References

1970 births
Living people
English cricketers
Gloucestershire cricketers
Cricketers from Bristol